Sahodari is a 1959 Indian Tamil-language drama film directed by A. Bhimsingh, starring K. Balaji, Rajasulochana, Prem Nazir, Devika and J. P. Chandrababu. It was released on 11 December 1959.

Plot 

Pazhani has two children — Chandiran and Meena. Meena is married. Chandiran loves Pankajam. His father and grandmother want him to marry a relative girl, Thangam, who is very helpful to the family. But Chandiran marries Pankajam defying them. Meena's husband spends money in drinking and gambling. He also cheats her and develops a relationship with the milk woman. Meena is worried. Pankajam, who hailed from a rich family is not financially satisfied with Chandiran. She also starts suspecting Chandiran as having an affair with Thangam. Anandakonar, a milkman, who is also the fiancée of the milk woman finds out the extravagant life led by Meena's husband and his trying to seduce his fiancée, the milk woman. Anandakonar tries to bring a solution. How everything is solved forms the crux of the story.

Cast 
The list was adapted from the film's review article in The Hindu and the film's opening credits.

Male cast
 Balaji as Meena's husband
 Prem Nazir as Chandran
 Nagayya as Pazhani
 Muthuraman as Ravi
 Ashokan as Devika's brother
 J. P. Chandrababu as Anandakonar
Male support cast
 Rama Rao, C. V. V. Panthulu, Gemini Balu,Dhanapal, Ramaiah, Chandran, Jayasakthivel,M. M. Muthu, and S. L. Narayan.

Female cast
 Rajasulochana as Meena
 N. Lalitha as Thangam
 Devika as Pankajam
 Padmini Priyadarshini as Milkmaid
 S. R. Janaki
 Kamakshi
 Lakshmi (Maadi)

Production 
The film was produced by Gubbi Veeranna and C. R. Basavaraj, both from the Kannada cinema alongside AVM Productions. The story of the film was written by Krishnamurthi Puranic, a Kannada writer. The film was made both in Kannada and Tamil. Murasoli Maran wrote the screenplay and dialogues for the Tamil version. The production was financed by A. V. Meiyappan.

Maran initially refused to write dialogues for the film after coming to know that Rajasulochana was the lead actress of the film who refused acting in his home production Kuravanji. Krishnan (of Krishnan–Panju) spoke to M. Karunanidhi who insisted Maran to write dialogues to which he agreed. After completing the film, Meiyappan found the film lacked an ingredient that would ensure box office success. The milkman character played by J. P. Chandrababu was included on his recommendation as an afterthought.

Soundtrack 
The music was composed by R. Sudarsanam and the lyrics were penned by Kannadasan.

References

External links 

 

1950s Tamil-language films
1959 drama films
1959 films
Films directed by A. Bhimsingh
Indian black-and-white films
Films scored by R. Sudarsanam
Indian drama films